Santiago Ojeda (born 26 April 1951) is a Peruvian footballer. He played in five matches for the Peru national football team in 1975. He was also part of Peru's squad for the 1975 Copa América tournament.

References

1951 births
Living people
Peruvian footballers
Peru international footballers
Place of birth missing (living people)
Association football midfielders
Atlético Grau footballers
Sport Boys footballers
Atlético Chalaco footballers
Alianza F.C. footballers
Portuguesa F.C. players
Panionios F.C. players
Deportivo Municipal footballers
Peruvian expatriate footballers
Expatriate footballers in Venezuela
Expatriate footballers in Greece